The Inyo Council for the Arts is the official arts council for Inyo County, California, USA. 

The council operates under the California Arts Council (CAC), the public arts council for the State of California.

The ICA Gallery, located in Bishop, California, features changing exhibits of art by local artists.

External links

Arts councils of California
Art museums and galleries in California
Inyo County, California
Bishop, California
Tourist attractions in Inyo County, California